The Indian Institute of Management Act, 2017 is an Indian legislation. The Act declared the Indian Institutes of Management as institutions of national importance and enabled them to offer degrees and further make substantial changes in their administration.

Premise 
The bill was approved by the Union Cabinet on 24January 2017.

The Act was introduced as a bill in Lok Sabha by the Minister of Human Resource Development, Prakash Javadekar, on 9February 2017. The bill was passed by the Lok Sabha on 28July 2017, and by the Rajya Sabha on 19December 2017. After receiving the President's assent, the bill became an Act on 31December 2017.

Provisions 
The Act declares Indian Institutes of Management as institutions of national importance and grants them the power to give degrees.

Board of governors 
The Act provides for the creation of a boards of governors, which would act as the principal executive body for each IIM, and would appoint onedirector for each IIM, whose pay is 225,000 in seventh pay commission but who is entitled to a variable pay.

The board of governors would have a maximum of nineteenmembers including onechairperson of the board; a nominee each from central and state governments; twomembers of the faculty; foureminent personalities from fields including education and industry, oneof whom has to be a woman, and; the director of the institute.

Academic council 
The Act provides for the creation of an academic council for each IIM,  which is the principal academic body under the act and which would decide the: (a) academic content; (b) criteria and processes for admissions to course; and (c) guidelines for conduct of examinations.

The academic council would comprise: (a) the director; (b) deans in charge of academics, research, student affairs and other such functions of the institute; (c) chairs and coordinators of various areas, programmes, faculties, centres, departments and schools of the institute; (d) all full-time faculty members at the level of professor and; (e) members, by invitation of the board — on the recommendation of the director — who are eminent in the fields of industry, finance, management, academics and public administration.

Coordination forum 
The Act provides for the creation of a coordination forum, which would discuss matters pertaining to all IIMs.

The coordination forum would comprise: (a) Higher Education Secretary (ex-officio); (b) twosecretaries in charge of management education of state governments in which the institutes are located, by rotation, each year (ex-officio); (c) fourchairpersons of institutes, to be nominated by the chairperson of the coordination forum, by rotation for twoyears; (d) the director of each institute (ex-officio); (d) fiveeminent personalities—of whom onehas to be of a woman—in the fields of academia and public service.

The bill also proposes to incorporate many other changes like audit of institutes by the Comptroller and Auditor General of India.

Aftermath 
Even after the commencement of the Act, not all IIMs granted degrees in the first year of its commencement. IIM Lucknow, IIM Ranchi, IIM Rohtak and IIM Ahmedabad granted postgraduate diplomas, whereas IIM Bangalore, IIM Calcutta, IIM Indore, IIM Udaipur, IIM Visakhapatnam granted degrees.

In March 2018, IIMs were told at a meeting with HRD ministry that the Act only empowered them to grant degrees for courses with duration of twoyears or more. Further, the ministry told the institutes that, for them to confer degrees not mentioned in the University Grants Commission Act, 1956, the institutes would have to seek the government's permission. IIMs were also asked to chalk up their action plan and outline their long term strategy.

References 

Acts of the Parliament of India 2017
Act